Don Yute is a Jamaican recording artist based in Kingston, Jamaica signed to Golden Child Music Group and specialising in reggae. He is best known for his 1995 collaboration with Wayne Wonder; Sensi Ride.

Biography

Early life and careers (1990s)

Born Jason Andrew Williams on 9 May 1974, in Port Antonio, Portland, Jamaica, Williams is best known for his 1995 collaboration with Wayne Wonder. He then went on to record "African Thing" with Prezident Brown (released on Island/Mango), the success of which led him to work with producers such as Bobby "Digital" (Funny, Funny), Donovan Germain (All That Glitters), Steely and Clevie (Hard Core), as well as Grammy award winning producer Jim Jonsin (who has worked on songs such as Space Bound, by Eminem and Lollipop by Lil' Wayne). He maintained a high profile in Jamaica in the late 1990s with the singles Gal It Wouldn’t Easy, You Own Di Man, La La La, Golden Child and Livin’ In A Dream. In 1997 he released his debut album. In the same year he appeared at Sting '97 with then newcomer Sean Paul with whom Williams had attended school (Paul considers Williams his mentor). In the later half of the 1990s the studios that handled Williams' music were delivering thousands of Dancehall releases. He attended Wolmer's Schools where he represented the school in table tennis.

Later career and international success (2000s–present)
In 2005, Yute signed a deal with Capitol Records.

Album discography

Chart history
Chart - Billboard R&B/Hip-Hop songs
Song - Row Da Boat ft. Soundbank Music
Featured Artist - Yin Yang Twins
Peak Position - 94

References

1974 births
Living people
Jamaican reggae singers